Diego Schwartzman was the reigning champion from when the tournament was last held in 2019, but chose to compete at the Summer Olympics instead.

Cameron Norrie won his maiden ATP Tour title, defeating Brandon Nakashima in the final, 6–2, 6–2.

Seeds
The top 4 seeds receive a bye into the second round.

Draw

Finals

Top half

Bottom half

Qualifying

Seeds

Qualifiers

Qualifying draw

First qualifier

Second qualifier

Third qualifier

Fourth qualifier

References

External Links
 Main draw
 Qualifying draw

Los Cabos Open - Singles
2021 Singles